Wamuran Basin is a rural locality in the Moreton Bay Region, Queensland, Australia.

History 
The locality takes its name from a local Aboriginal man, Menvil Wamuran (also known as Jacky Delaney).

Basin State School opened on 2 March 1920. It closed on 1957. It was unofficially known as Wamuran Basin State School.

References

Suburbs of Moreton Bay Region
Localities in Queensland